Lamorbey is a district of South East London in the London Borough of Bexley, located north of Sidcup. It borders the Royal Borough of Greenwich. Significant buildings in the area are Holy Trinity Church, Lamorbey House and some of the original surviving buildings of The Hollies children's home (now converted to residential use). The oldest house in Sidcup, dating from 1452, can also be found in the district.

The principal road becomes Halfway Street and is flanked by old cottages and Ye Olde Black Horse pub, established in 1743, though rebuilt in 1892. Lamorbey House, a listed building in a well maintained public park, houses Rose Bruford College. Lamorbey Park adjacent to the house contains large ponds where fishing continues. Sidcup Golf Course is located to its east, as are Hurstmere School and Chislehurst and Sidcup Grammar School, whose pupils wear distinctive purple blazers.

The district is typical suburbia, mainly built in the 1930s. Prior to that much of the land was used for the growing of hops—wild hops may still be found growing on the Old Farm Avenue allotments. Some farmbuildings were located next to Sidcup sorting office and included characteristic Kentish oast houses.

Other local landmarks are the clock house, pool and the former administrative block of The Hollies children's home (1901–1983) which is now at the heart of an up-market housing estate.

Transport

Rail
The closest National Rail station is Sidcup with services to London Charing Cross, London Cannon Street via Lewisham, London Cannon Street via Woolwich Arsenal and to Gravesend.

Buses
Lamorbey is served by three Transport for London bus routes 51, 229 and 286.

Education

References

External links
Pictures of Lamborey landmarks

Districts of the London Borough of Bexley
Areas of London
Sidcup